Hermitage Green are an Irish acoustic folk rock band. Formed in July 2010, the band primarily feature on the Limerick music scene. They have toured in Ireland, the UK, and Australia.

History
Hermitage Green signed with Sony Music Ireland in 2015 and began work on their first studio album. The band released their debut studio album, Save Your Soul, in March 2016.

Later in 2016, the band released a live EP, Live at the Curragower Bar, which was dedicated to the band's early days at The Curragower pub in Limerick.

Personnel
Barry Murphy
Dan Murphy
Darragh Griffin
Darragh Graham
Dermot Sheedy

Discography

Studio albums

Live albums

Extended plays

Charted singles

References

External links

Musical groups established in 2010
Musical groups from Limerick (city)
Irish folk rock groups
2010 establishments in Ireland